The Caricatura Museum, official name Caricatura Museum für Komische Kunst, is a museum for comic art in Frankfurt, Hesse, Germany. It shows a in a permanent exhibition works by the artists of the Neue Frankfurter Schule, and additionally exhibitions of contemporary artists.

History 
In 2000, a group called Caricatura of the Historical Museum, Frankfurt, began to prepare a museum for comic art in Frankfurt. The permanent exhibition shows works by F. W. Bernstein, Robert Gernhardt,  and F. K. Waechter, including literary works and films. It is complemented by readings, book presentations and other events.

The trade mark of the museum is a bronze sculpture in front of the building by Hans Traxler. The Elch sculpture carries the names of the eight most important representatives of the Neue Frankfurter Schule, and a two-line poem by F. W. Bernstein, "Die schärfsten Kritiker der Elche /  waren früher selber welche" ("The harshest critics of the moose / used themselves to be some").

Museumsufer 
Caricatura Museum is part of the Museumsufer.

See also 
 Museumsufer

References

External links 

 
 

Museums in Frankfurt
Cartooning museums
Art museums established in 1984
Art museums and galleries in Germany